Kolpashevsky District is an administrative and municipal district (raion), one of the sixteen in Tomsk Oblast, Russia. It is located in the center of the oblast. Its administrative center is the town of Kolpashevo. Population: 41,183 (2010 Census);  The population of Kolpashevo accounts for 58.6% of the district's total population.

References

Notes

Sources

Districts of Tomsk Oblast